Katrin Beierl (born 16 August 1993) is an Austrian bobsledder. She competed in the two-woman event at the 2018 Winter Olympics.

References

External links
 

1993 births
Living people
Austrian female bobsledders
Olympic bobsledders of Austria
Bobsledders at the 2018 Winter Olympics
Bobsledders at the 2022 Winter Olympics
Place of birth missing (living people)
People from Mödling
Sportspeople from Lower Austria